Thomas Marriott Barlow (December 1864 – 27 January 1942) was an English-born international rugby union forward who played club rugby for Cardiff Rugby Football Club and international rugby for Wales. An all round sportsman, Barlow also played cricket for Glamorgan and South Wales.

Rugby career 
Born in Pendleton, Lancashire, Barlow moved to Wales where he joined local rugby club, Cardiff. In 1884, Barlow was chosen to represent Wales, in a game against Ireland, as part of the Home Nations Championship. Barlow found himself brought into the Welsh squad at full-back to replace Charles Lewis and was one of six new caps brought into the side after Wales had lost the opening two games of the Championship. The game was played at the Cardiff Arms Park, and the travelling Irish team turned up for the match two players short, with accounts at the time crediting Wales players Purdon and Jordan being drafted in to complete the team. Under the captaincy of Joe Simpson, Wales won the game by a dropped goal and two tries to nil. Although a rare victory for the Welsh team, Barlow lost his place the very next match when Wales rugby legend Arthur 'Monkey' Gould was given the full-back role.

International matches played
Wales
  1884

Cricket career 
Barlow played cricket for South Wales from 1883 to 1895 and in 1894 was selected for Glamorgan County Cricket Club. He played in two county matches for Glamorgan, against Wiltshire and Worcestershire in 1896.

External links 
 Cricket Archive Cricket biography of Barlow, with portrait
 Scrum.com Rugby biography of Barlow

Bibliography

References 

1864 births
1942 deaths
Cardiff RFC players
English rugby union players
Glamorgan cricketers
People from Pendleton, Greater Manchester
Rugby union forwards
Rugby union players from Lancashire
Wales international rugby union players
Wales rugby union captains
Welsh cricketers